Kevin Kane may refer to:

 Kevin Kane (American football) (born 1983), American football coach and former player
 Kevin Kane (musician), Canadian songwriter, musician, and record producer
 Kevin C. Kane, formerly an FDNY fireboat

Kane, Kevin